Ernst Poetsch (29 June 1883 – 1950) was a German international footballer.

References

1883 births
1950 deaths
Association football midfielders
German footballers
Germany international footballers
Place of birth missing